Pierre Gérald (26 May 1906 – 24 March 2012) was a French actor who acted professionally in theater, movies and television series for over 50 years.

Early life
Born in Paris on 26 May 1906 into a family of diamond dealers, Gérald entered show business in 1954 as a stage actor. His stage career lasted almost 50 years, with his last final appearance in 2002 in La Traversée de Samuel R. (The Crossing of Samuel R).

Career
In 1961 he made his screen debut in the French television series L'inspecteur Leclerc enquête. This was followed by series such as Les dossiers de Jérôme Randax, Der kleine Doktor and La maison des autres. In 1980 Gérald appeared in his first film La bande du Rex.

He continued to act well into his 90s and centennial years appearing in films and TV. He was in the Canal+ comedy series H set in a hospital in a Paris suburb as well as the TV series Highlander in 1992. In 2005 he appeared as the grandfather in the comedy Les poupées russes (Russian Dolls). At the time of his death on 24 March 2012 he was considered to be the oldest living working actor. His last film credit was in 2007, at the age of 101. This was in the romantic film Ensemble, c'est tout (Hunting and Gathering) directed by Claude Berri that starred Audrey Tautou and Guillaume Canet.

Filmography

References

External links
 

1906 births
2012 deaths
French centenarians
Male actors from Paris
French male stage actors
French male film actors
French male television actors
Men centenarians